"Let the Thunder of Victory Rumble!" was an unofficial Russian national anthem in the late 18th and early 19th century.

The lyrics were written by the premier Russian poet of the time, Gavrila Derzhavin, and the music by composer Józef Kozłowski, in 1791. The song was written to commemorate the capture of major Ottoman fortress Izmail by the great Russian general Aleksandr Suvorov. This event effectively ended the Seventh Russo-Turkish War.

The tune is a polonaise.

This anthem was eventually replaced by a formal imperial anthem, "God Save the Tsar!", which was adopted in 1833.

Text of the song (excerpt)

Notes

References

External links
Anthem as it sounded in original Polonaise form 
Russian anthems site (you can find recordings of "Grom pobedy" towards the end of the page or listen it  here)

Historical national anthems
Russian anthems
1791 compositions
Ottoman Empire–Russian Empire relations
Anti-Islam works